ABWA may refer to:
ABWA, NGO of young people in village Bazidpur. This NGO is working many projects in village.
Al-Abwa, a village belong to Rabigh on the western coast of Saudi Arabia
American Business Women's Association, a national professional association for women
Association of Accountancy Bodies in West Africa, a regional organization of the International Federation of Accountants